The Guwahati Tea Auction Centre (GTAC) is one of the busiest tea trading facilities in the world. It is located in Guwahati and its primary commodity under the hammer is Assam tea. It was established in 1970. It has seen the largest volume of CTC tea auction in the world.

See also
 Indian tea culture
 Tea processing

References

External links
 Assam tea xchange

Economy of Guwahati
Tea industry in Assam
Indian auction houses
Tea auctions
Dispur